Podhorie may refer to several villages and municipalities in Slovakia:

 Podhorie, Banská Štiavnica District
 Podhorie, Žilina District